Hal Dwane Mitchell (August 11, 1930 – November 15, 1993) was a professional American football offensive tackle in the National Football League (NFL) for the New York Giants.  He played college football at the University of California, Los Angeles (UCLA) and was drafted in the 14th round of the 1952 NFL Draft.  Mitchell was the head football coach at Brigham Young University (BYU) from 1961 to 1963, compiling an 8–22 record.  Mitchell died of cancer on November 27, 1993, at his home in Corralitos, California.

Head coaching record

References

External links
 

1930 births
1993 deaths
American football offensive guards
American football offensive tackles
BYU Cougars football coaches
UCLA Bruins football players
New York Giants players
Sportspeople from Los Angeles County, California
Players of American football from California
Lawndale, California